Harvest is the tenth studio album by Japanese band Tokio, released on October 18, 2006. It is one of Tokio's most successful albums, having peaked at second place on the Oricon weekly charts and charted for eighteen weeks.

Track listing

Disc 1

Disc 2

Release history

References 

2006 albums
Tokio (band) albums